Huns Nunatak is a nunatak rising to about  in the center of the Milky Way, a mountain pass between the LeMay Range and the Planet Heights, in the central portion of Alexander Island, Antarctica. The name originates from dog teams named "The Huns" that served at various British stations in Antarctica, 1961–74, and honors the loyal service of all Falkland Islands Dependencies Survey/British Antarctic Survey sled dogs.

References

Nunataks of Alexander Island